Gilles Simon was the defending champion, but chose not to compete this year.

Jo-Wilfried Tsonga won the title, defeating Ivan Ljubičić 6–3, 6–7(4–7), 6–3 in the final. It was his first title since October 2009, having failed to make a single ATP World Tour final in 2010.

Seeds

Qualifying

Draw

Finals

Top half

Bottom half

References
 Main draw
 

Singles